Halloween 5: The Revenge of Michael Myers is a 1989 American slasher film co-written and directed by Dominique Othenin-Girard, and starring Donald Pleasence and Danielle Harris. The fifth installment in the Halloween series, it follows serial killer Michael Myers who again returns to the town of Haddonfield to murder his niece, Jamie Lloyd, who, traumatized from his previous attack on her, has been institutionalized following her attempt to murder her foster mother.

After the success of the previous installment, Halloween 4: The Return of Michael Myers (1988), Halloween 5: The Revenge of Michael Myers was rushed into production by executive producer Moustapha Akkad. The original screenplay, which was still under revision at the time filming began, introduced elements of supernatural horror, including Jamie possessing a telepathic link to Michael Myers, as well as a storied subplot in which Myers, under the influence of a cult centered around the ancient rune of Thorn, is driven to kill his bloodline. While the final cut of the film features a mysterious "Man in Black" character, the "Curse of Thorn" subplot was largely minimized, resulting in audiences and critics expressing some confusion, though it was expanded upon in the following film, Halloween: The Curse of Michael Myers (1995).

Filmed in Salt Lake City in mid-1989, Halloween 5: The Revenge of Michael Myers was released theatrically in North America in October of that year by the independent studio Galaxy Releasing. The film received generally negative reviews from critics and was a box office disappointment, only grossing $11.6 million domestically against a $5.5 million budget.

Plot
On October 31, 1988, Michael Myers is shot and falls down a salt mine shaft. Sheriff Ben Meeker, the lynch mob of Haddonfield's truckers, and state police toss down dynamite to finish him off. Escaping into a nearby creek before the dynamite explodes, Michael stumbles upon an elderly hermit who nurses him back to health after he falls into a coma. One year later, on October 30, 1989, Michael awakens, stabs the hermit to death with his knife, and returns to Haddonfield to find his niece Jamie Lloyd again, who narrowly avoided being killed by him the year before.

Jamie has been admitted to the Haddonfield Children's Clinic after having attacked her foster mother. Jamie has been rendered mute due to psychological trauma, suffering from nightmares and seizures and exhibits signs of a telepathic link with her uncle. Dr. Sam Loomis becomes aware of Jamie's psychic link with Michael, and tries to convince Meeker that Michael is still alive. Meanwhile, Michael stabs Jamie's foster sister Rachel to death and begins stalking their friend Tina. Michael kills Tina's boyfriend Mike, then poses as him by wearing a mask that Tina had given to Mike earlier.

Later that night, Tina and her friends Sam and Spitz go to a Halloween party at a farm. Sensing that Tina is in danger, Jamie (having partially regained her ability to speak) goes to warn her. While Sam and Spitz are having sex in the barn, Michael impales Spitz with a pitchfork and decapitates Sam with a scythe. Tina finds the bodies, and goes to warn nearby police deputies but finds that Michael has already killed them. Tina flees, but Jamie and her friend Billy Hill (a fellow patient from the clinic) arrive. Michael begins chasing Jamie in a car but crashes into a tree. Michael exits the car, and Tina sacrifices herself to allow Jamie and Billy time to escape. Loomis arrives, and Jamie finally agrees to help him stop Michael for good.

With Jamie's help, Loomis and Meeker have created a set up at the old Myers house to lure him back to his abandoned childhood home. Suddenly, the police receive a call saying Michael has broken into the clinic, which prompts Meeker and most of the officers to leave; however, this call is merely a diversion. Michael appears and kills the trooper sitting in the patrol car outside, before entering the house. Loomis tries to reason with him, but Michael slashes him and throws him over the stair banister. Michael kills deputy Bloch who was protecting Jamie before chasing her throughout the house. Jamie hides in a laundry chute but is forced to abandon it when Michael stabs and injures her. Fleeing upstairs, Jamie finds the bodies of Max the dog, Rachel, and Mike in the attic. Michael finds Jamie and attempts to kill her, but stops when Jamie addresses him as 'Uncle," and removes his mask. When Jamie touches his face he goes into a fit of rage, and chases her again. Jamie heads downstairs and finds Loomis. Loomis uses Jamie to lure Michael into a trap, shooting him with a tranquilizer gun and dropping a steel net onto him. He beats the trapped, drugged Michael unconscious with a wooden plank until he eventually suffers from a stroke and collapses on top of Michael.

Meeker and the rest of the police return shortly thereafter and Michael is then taken into custody. Meeker assures Jamie that Michael, who is locked up in a cell, will remain in prison until he dies; Jamie doesn't believe him, however, and remarks that Michael will "never die." One of the officers goes to bring Jamie home when a mysterious man in black, who has been searching for Michael, arrives and causes an explosion at the police station. The officer, hearing gunfire, rushes back inside after warning Jamie to stay with the car. When the officer doesn't return, Jamie goes back inside to investigate and finds the station destroyed from the explosion, along with Meeker and several of his men dead. Jamie discovers Michael's cell empty and the back door of the police station broken open, causing her to break down in tears as she realizes Michael is free again to continue terrorizing Haddonfield.

Cast

Production

Development
Development on a fifth Halloween was fast tracked to meet a pre-set release deadline of October 1989. Producer Moustapha Akkad turned to Halloween 4: The Return of Michael Myers writer and director Alan B. McElroy and Dwight H. Little to return for their respective duties on the fifth film, however both declined. Ramsey Thomas assumed producing responsibilities from the fourth film's Paul Freeman, and opted to hire playwright Shem Bitterman as screenwriter. Bitterman's script, entitled Halloween 5: The Killer Inside Me, which was written in the span of three days, featured an evil Jamie Lloyd and resurrected Michael Myers once again. However, Akkad was adamant about making Myers the sole antagonist of the film. Nevertheless, Bitterman penned a second draft by February 1989 and Jeff Burr, director of From a Whisper to a Scream, was being courted to helm the film. Burr's producing partners Darin Scott and William Burr were also in the mix to co-produce alongside Thomas. The directing job was seemingly Burr's until series co-creator Debra Hill met director Dominique Othenin-Girard at the 1989 Sundance Film Festival, and recommended him to Akkad. 

After being instated as director, he infamously threw Bitterman's draft into a trashcan in front of Akkad. He brought in Robert Harders, of Home Movies, to write an entirely new draft, which saw a Frankenstein inspired story where Myers is resurrected and no longer evil but is pursued by an angry mob. Harders's pitch was rejected, leading Othenin-Girard to pitch a new concept with co-writer Michael Jacobs. The duo's initial title was Halloween 5... And Things That Go Bump In the Night. After reviewing the screenplay, director Othenin-Girard added Jamie's inability to speak to the draft, along with the supernatural plot device of her telepathic visions connected to Michael.

Another departure from previous films in the series was Othenin-Girard's attempt to persuade the audience to relate to the Michael Myers character, whom he intended to appear "more human [...] even vulnerable, with contradicting feelings inside of him." He illustrated these feelings with a scene where Michael removes his mask and sheds a tear. Girard explains, "Again, to humanize him, to give him a tear. If Evil or in this case our boogeyman knows pain, or love or demonstrate a feeling of regrets; he becomes even more scary to me if he pursues his malefic action. He shows an evil determination beyond his feelings. Dr. Loomis tries to reach his emotional side several times in [Halloween 5]. He thinks he could cure Michael through his feelings."

In the original closing scene, after Jamie finds that Michael has escaped from the police station, she is approached by a black-cloaked figure. At the time of filming, it was unknown who this figure was. It would only be expanded on and explained in the subsequent film, Halloween: The Curse of Michael Myers (1995), and the scene in question was attached to the beginning of the Producer's Cut of that film as a flashback. Though the cuts made to the beginning and ending of the film largely diminish this subplot, the "Man in Black" character still appears momentarily on several occasions in the film, which led to some confusion among audiences upon its original release.

Casting
Returning from Halloween 4 was Donald Pleasence as Dr. Sam Loomis, along with Danielle Harris, Ellie Cornell, and Beau Starr, as Jamie Lloyd, Rachel Carruthers, and Sheriff Ben Meeker, respectively.

Though enthusiastic of reprising her role as Rachel, Cornell was disappointed to learn that her character would be killed early in the film. In the original screenplay, her character died after Michael shoved a pair of scissors down her throat, but Cornell felt that this would be too gruesome, and requested that the writers change it; as a result, she is instead stabbed in the chest.

Karen Alston, who portrayed Darlene Carruthers in the previous film, reprised her role in the beginning of the film showing the anonymous person in the mask stabbing her as she falls into the bathtub of water. Her voice-over was recorded by Wendy Kaplan. Kaplan won the role of Tina Williams, the loud and wily friend of Rachel's. After Rachel's demise, Tina inherits the role of Jamie's protector.

George P. Wilbur, who had portrayed The Shape in the previous film, did not express interest in returning to play the role (although he did work as a stunt player on the film). Don Shanks was cast to play the speech-less, white-masked murderer. Shanks had already played a similar character in the first two Silent Night, Deadly Night films. Shanks also had a double role as the Man in Black. Wilbur, who had to wear hockey pads to appear to have a bigger build, would later portray the Shape again in the next installment, Halloween: The Curse of Michael Myers. Shanks did not have to wear the hockey pads because he already had a larger build.

Max Robinson would play Maxwell Hart, the doctor who assists Jamie when she is having one of her nightmares in the beginning of the film. Betty Carvalho appears as his assistant, Nurse Patsey, who has a "motherly" feel to Jamie. Jeffrey Landman portrayed Billy Hill, Jamie's best friend, who has a stutter. Landman worked with a coach who taught him about stuttering to help him prepare for the role.

Newcomers such as Tamara Glynn, Matthew Walker, and Jonathan Chapin appear as Samantha Thomas, Spitz, and Mike, who are friends of Tina and Rachel. Walker would later appear in another slasher film, Child's Play 3 (1991).

Filming
Principal photography began on May 1, 1989, in Salt Lake City, Utah, as well as the surrounding communities of Provo and Ogden. Several prior filming locations from Halloween 4: The Return of Michael Myers are featured in the film, including the Carruthers residence, as well as the local general store. At the time the shoot began, the film's screenplay was still unfinished.

According to actress Wendy Kaplan, Donald Pleasence exhibited utmost professionalism to the material, and while filming, treated it "like he was doing Shakespeare."

Unable to find a lookalike Myers house that matched the original Halloween, the filmmakers chose a bigger, more mansion-like house because they needed one that could provide wide rooms, hallways, an attic, a basement, and a laundry chute.

Donald Pleasence accidentally broke Don Shanks' nose on the set when they were filming the scene where Dr. Loomis beats The Shape with a 2×4 block of wood.

Don Shanks was also injured when he was filming the scene where The Shape crashes Mike's Camaro into the tree. Othenin-Girard had forgotten to yell "Cut!" and fire was beginning to emerge from the car (Shanks put this down to Othenin-Girard being sidetracked by seeing stunts take place during his first major directing job). Finally, stunt coordinator Don Hunt told Othenin-Girard to finally yell "cut". Wendy Kaplan was also injured in this scene, as the car almost ran over the top of her.

Filming completed on June 11, 1989.

Original Opening 
The film's original screenplay featured a young hermit who takes in the injured Michael at the beginning of the film, whose shack was filled with ancient runes, tablets, and other occult items used to perform necromancy. Though initially filmed as such, with Theron Read portraying the young man (known as "Dr. Death"), the sequence was later re-shot featuring an older actor, and the occult paraphernalia and theme removed. In subsequent years, the original footage featuring Read was thought to be lost. This original sequence had been intended to set the groundwork for a subplot that had Michael Myers under the "Curse of Thorn," controlled by a cult devoted to this ancient rune.

In April 2019, actor Don Shanks reported that film reels had been discovered which may contain the original lost opening scene. In August 2021, it was revealed that Scream Factory had obtained the original opening sequence of the film to be included as a bonus feature on their forthcoming UHD and Blu-ray, which was released October 5, 2021.

Post-production
The film had originally been given an X rating from the Motion Picture Association of America (MPAA) due to its graphic depiction of violence, particularly the sequence in which Jamie, hiding in the laundry chute, is stabbed in the leg by Michael.

Music
Alan Howarth returned to compose the film. Similar to previous movies in the Halloween franchise, the soundtrack contains the score and songs heard throughout the film by bands and solo artists such as White Sister and Rhythm Tribe. There are also some unknown bands and solo artists on the soundtrack such as Becca, DV8, Eileen Clark, Diggy, and Mark Chosak. The soundtrack was released to Compact Disc, LP Vinyl Record, and Cassette Tape on September 11, 1989.

Release

Box office
Halloween 5 opened theatrically in North America on October 13, 1989. It earned $5.1 million in its opening weekend, ranking number four at the United States box office. It continued to screen throughout November 1989, with a reported earning of $449,686 during the weekend of November 3, 1989, showing on 537 screens. The film's theatrical run lasted three months, concluding in December 1989, with an ultimate gross of $11.6 million domestically.

Critical response
Stephen Holden of The New York Times wrote that the film was "rather like taking another swing through the same all-too-familiar funhouse", but thought it was "a bit more refined in its details than the conventional horror movie". Variety called the film "pretty stupid and boring fare" and noted that the series had become "practically indistinguishable from the Friday the 13th pics". Richard Harrington of the Los Angeles Times criticized the film as being "a prime example of the principle of diminishing reruns" and Donald Pleasence for "a flat two-note performance", though he thought Danielle Harris was "actually pretty good" in her role.

Some critics derided the film for its obscure appearances of the "Man in Black" character, which was not elucidated in the final cut of the film. Gary Thompson of the Philadelphia Daily News noted this in his review, commenting that "his identity is never revealed, and his actions are never explained. What does this mean? It means the series has turned into a soap opera, attempting to keep the audience interested with cheap dramatic stunts borrowed from daytime television." The Hartford Courants Malcolm L. Johnson, however, gave the film a favorable review, deeming it the best sequel in the series and praising Othenin-Girard's "arty touch to the stalkings and killings."

On the internet review aggregator Rotten Tomatoes, as of November 2022, the film has an average approval rating of 12% based on 26 reviews, with a consensus reading: "Halloween 5: The Revenge Of Michael Myers finds the series embracing crude slasher conventions with pedestrian scares, disposable characters, and aimless plotting."

Home media
Halloween 5: The Revenge of Michael Myers was released on VHS and LaserDisc by CBS/Fox Video in 1990. In September 2000, Anchor Bay Entertainment released the film on VHS and DVD, including a limited edition DVD housed in a tin box with collectible lobby cards. Anchor Bay reissued the DVD with additional bonus materials in 2006 before releasing it on Blu-ray in 2012. In September 2014, the film was included in a Blu-ray box set of the entire Halloween film series, released by Scream Factory, in association with Anchor Bay, in both a standard and deluxe limited edition. On October 5, 2021, Shout! Factory sub-label Scream Factory released the film in a UHD and Blu-ray combination package, featuring a new 4K scan of the original film elements, as well as newly-discovered cut footage included as a bonus feature.

Notes

References

Sources

External links

 
 
 
 
 
 
 

1989 films
1989 horror films
1980s slasher films
American films about revenge
American independent films
American sequel films
American serial killer films
American slasher films
American supernatural horror films
1980s English-language films
Films about orphans
Films about telepathy
Films directed by Dominique Othenin-Girard
Films scored by Alan Howarth (composer)
Films set in 1988
Films set in 1989
Films set in abandoned houses
Films set in Illinois
Films shot in Salt Lake City
5
Films about children
1980s American films